Peckols and Patollo (known under a multitude of different names) were gods in the pagan Prussian mythology who were worshiped by the Old Prussians. Most researchers believe that, despite varying names, Peckols and Patollo were probably the same god in charge of the underworld and the dead. It is usually described as an angry, evil spirit similar to the Lithuanian Velnias. 

Patollu was first mentioned in 1418, by Bishop of Warmia in a letter to the Pope. Chronicler Simon Grunau (1529) provided more vivid but dubious details about Patollo. According to Grunau, Patollo was one of the three gods portrayed on the flag and coat of arms of King Widewuto and worshiped in the temple of Rickoyoto. He was portrayed as an old man with a white beard and a white headdress similar to a turban. He was a frightening and ruthless god of the dead who would haunt and taunt the living if they disobeyed their pagan priests or buried the dead without proper sacrifices to the gods. Many other early modern writers, including Alexander Guagnini and Lucas David, followed Grunau in their descriptions of Patollo.

The Sudovian Book (1520s), mentioned two beings – Peckols, the god of hell and darkness, and Pockols, the airborne spirit or devil. The same pair is also found in the church decrees of 1530 (Constitutiones Synodales). There, Pecols was identified with the Roman god of the underworld, Pluto and Pocols with the Greek deities of anger, the Furies. Jan Sandecki Malecki followed the Sudovian Book and wrote about Pocclum and Poccollum. Jonas Bretkūnas, Caspar Hennenberger, and later authors attempted to reconcile the accounts provided by Grunau and the Sudovian Book. In the 17th century Christoph Hartknoch and Matthäus Prätorius testified that people still believed in Picolli and Pykullis.

References

Death gods
Prussian gods
Lithuanian gods
Baltic gods
Underworld gods